Eupera is a genus of bivalves belonging to the family Sphaeriidae.

The species of this genus are found in America and Africa.

Species:

Eupera bahamensis 
Eupera bahiensis 
Eupera barbadensis 
Eupera crassa 
Eupera cubensis 
Eupera degorteri 
Eupera doellojuradoi 
Eupera elliptica 
Eupera ferruginea 
Eupera gravis 
Eupera guaraniana 
Eupera haitiensis 
Eupera iguazuensis 
Eupera insignis 
Eupera klappenbachi 
Eupera meridionalis 
Eupera missouriensis 
Eupera modioliforme 
Eupera moquiniana 
Eupera onestae 
Eupera ovata 
Eupera parvula 
Eupera pittieri 
Eupera platensis 
Eupera portoricensis 
Eupera primei 
Eupera simoni 
Eupera singleyi 
Eupera sturanyi 
Eupera sublaevigata 
Eupera triangularis 
Eupera troglobia 
Eupera tumida 
Eupera veatleyi 
Eupera ventricosa 
Eupera viridans 
Eupera weinlandi 
Eupera yucatanensis

References

Sphaeriidae
Bivalve genera